Andrea Manzo (born 5 November 1961) is an Italian football manager and former midfielder.

Career

Playing
Manzo started his professional career in 1978 with Padova. He then played for a number of Serie A and Serie B teams, most notably Fiorentina, AC Milan and Udinese. He then decided to spend his final career years back in his native Veneto, with Caerano and then Mestre, before to retire from active football in 1997.

Coaching
Andrea Manzo started his coaching career in 2000, being appointed at the helm of Serie C2 team Sandonà. He was successively sacked and then reappointed by the club management in a poor season ended with a second consecutive direct relegation. He then coached amateur Eccellenza team Conegliano Calcio the following season, leading them to win the league hands down in his first season and obtaining a fifth place in the club's following Serie D campaign. He then coached Serie D team Pievigina before to join Venezia's managing staff.

Manzo was then successively appointed as caretaker coach during the final days of the arancioneroverdi'''s Serie B campaign, ended with the club being relegated and then cancelled from football. Successively, Venezia were refounded and started back from Serie C2, with Manzo being appointed as the new club's first boss. His second personal spell at Venezia however proved not to be lucky, as he was sacked during the season because of poor results.

In 2006, he agreed a contract with Portosummaga of Serie C2, leading his side to a fairly good season. He was successively appointed as youth team coach of Parma.

On 12 May 2008 he was surprisingly appointed as caretaker coach, replacing Hector Cúper, with the goal to defeat top flight league leaders Internazionale in the Serie A 2007-08's final matchday in order to save the ducali from relegation to Serie B, a goal he failed to achieve as Parma lost 2–0 to the nerazzurri'', returning to Serie B after 18 years in the top flight.

References

External links
Career stats (from footballplus.com)

Living people
1961 births
Sportspeople from the Metropolitan City of Venice
Association football midfielders
Italian footballers
Italian football managers
Italy youth international footballers
Italy under-21 international footballers
Calcio Padova players
L.R. Vicenza players
ACF Fiorentina players
U.C. Sampdoria players
A.C. Milan players
Udinese Calcio players
U.S. Avellino 1912 players
Venezia F.C. managers
Parma Calcio 1913 managers
Serie A players
Serie B players
Serie A managers
FC Lugano managers
FC Chiasso managers
Italian expatriate football managers
Expatriate football managers in Switzerland
Italian expatriate sportspeople in Switzerland
Footballers from Veneto
People from Mestre-Carpenedo